Manolis Siopis (born 14 May 1994) is a Greek professional footballer who plays as a defensive midfielder for Turkish Süper Lig club Trabzonspor and the Greece national team.

Club career

Olympiacos
Born in Tychero, Siopis began playing football with the Greek side Olympiacos.

Loan to Platanias
In 2013, he was loaned to Platanias and he made his debut in the Super League on 25 August 2014 against Ergotelis.

Panionios
On 1 August 2014 he joined the Greek club Panionios. On 1 June 2016, he voted from the fans as the MVP of the club for the 2015–16 season.

Prior to the 2016–17 season, the officials of Panathinaikos are monitoring the case of Panionios' defensive midfielder, whose current contract expires at summer of 2017. However, Olympiacos still hold the 30% of 23-year-old international's rights and this was the reason Panionios did not sell him to Italy last January, even if there were offers, because their profit would not had been big enough.

Return to Olympiacos
On 23 November 2016, the international defensive midfielder will return to his former club Olympiacos, where he started his professional career, in January 2017. The Reds will pay about €150,000 in order to purchase the 22-year-old former player of Platanias, whose current contract expires at summer of 2017 and is expected to remain at Panionios until the end of 2016–17 season.

Loan to Panionios
On 30 August 2017, Siopis returns to his former club, Panionios on loan from Olympiacos until the end of 2017–18 season. Olympiacos bought Siopis this summer but the player even he played three matches with Olympiacos was not in the initial plans of Besnik Hasi, after the last transfers.

Aris
On 27 August 2018, newly promoted Aris has taken out-of-favour midfielder Manolis Siopis as a free transfer from Olympiacos by signing a two-year contract for an undisclosed fee. Siopis was expected to be a key player for Olympiacos after a strong showing on loan with Panionios last season, but when engaging in a conflict with the club’s administration, he was exiled from the team.

On 5 May 2019, in the last matchday of the season, Siopis scored his first ever career goal, successfully converting a penalty, in a remarkable 7–2 home win against Xanthi.

Alanyaspor
On 30 June 2019, Alanyaspor paid the release clause of €500,000 for the Greek international, who will play for the Turkish club for the next three years on a fee of €2.1 million.

Trabzonspor
At the summer of 2021, after two full seasons with his previous club, Siopis signed a 3-year contract with Trabzonspor.

International career
Siopis made his Greece national team debut on 30 May 2019, in a friendly against Turkey, as a starter.

Personal life
Siopis' younger brother, Dimitrios, is also a professional footballer.

Career statistics
As of 16 February 2023 (UTC).

Honours

Club
Trabzonspor
Süper Lig: 2021–22
Turkish Super Cup: 2022

Individual
Super League Greece Team of the Year: 2015–16, 2016–17

References

External links
 
 
 
 

1994 births
Living people
Greek footballers
Greek expatriate footballers
Expatriate footballers in Turkey
Greek expatriate sportspeople in Turkey
Greece youth international footballers
Greece under-21 international footballers
Greece international footballers
Super League Greece players
Süper Lig players
Platanias F.C. players
Panionios F.C. players
Olympiacos F.C. players
Aris Thessaloniki F.C. players
Alanyaspor footballers
Trabzonspor footballers
Association football midfielders
People from Evros (regional unit)
Footballers from Eastern Macedonia and Thrace